The San Joaquin River Viaduct is a bridge built to carry California High-Speed Rail over the San Joaquin River. Most of the bridge is in the city of Fresno, California in Fresno County, although the portion north of the center line of the river is in Madera County.  It is the second major river crossing to be constructed as part of California High-Speed Rail, after the Fresno River Viaduct to the north.

It also crosses Herndon Avenue and Golden State Boulevard. The river crossing is immediately upstream of the Union Pacific Railroad and California State Route 99 crossings of the San Joaquin River.

History 
In 2012, the City of Fresno recommended building a through arch bridge with return arches to transition gracefully to the flanking box girder bridge segments, due to its visual appeal as a signature element along the northern approach to Fresno.  However, conceptual drawings in 2016 showed a different arch structure lacking the return arch transitions.

The bridge is part of Construction Package 1, the contract for which was awarded in August 2013.  Preliminary statnamic load testing on the riverbed occurred in February 2015 to test the stability of the bridge foundation in an earthquake.  Construction began in April 2016, and was expected to take 2–3 years to complete.

As of February 2019, crews were working over the San Joaquin River and making final preparations before placing concrete at the east archway of the viaduct. The concrete placement was while crews continued forming up the west archway and building an additional scaffold. These arches act as a suspension bridge support for the bridge span over the river. The bridge was deemed completed in May 2021.

References

External links 
 
 San Joaquin River Viaduct – California High-Speed Rail

California High-Speed Rail
Railroad bridges in California
Transportation buildings and structures in Fresno County, California
Transportation buildings and structures in Madera County, California
Concrete bridges in California
Viaducts in the United States
Arch bridges in the United States
Buildings and structures under construction in the United States